The Mauritshuis is an art museum in The Hague, Netherlands. The museum houses the Royal Cabinet of Paintings which consists of 854 objects, mostly Dutch Golden Age paintings. The collection contains works by Johannes Vermeer, Rembrandt van Rijn, Jan Steen, Paulus Potter, Frans Hals, Jacob van Ruisdael, Hans Holbein the Younger, and others. Originally, the 17th-century building was the residence of count John Maurice of Nassau. It is now the property of the government of the Netherlands and is listed in the top 100 Dutch heritage sites.

History 

In 1631, John Maurice, Prince of Nassau-Siegen, a cousin of stadtholder Frederick Henry, bought a plot bordering the Binnenhof and the adjacent Hofvijver pond in The Hague, at that time the political centre of the Dutch Republic. On the plot, the Mauritshuis was built as a home between 1636 and 1641, during John Maurice's governorship of Dutch Brazil. The Dutch Classicist building was designed by the Dutch architects Jacob van Campen and Pieter Post. The two-storey building is strictly symmetrical and contained four apartments and a great hall. Each apartment was designed with an antechamber, a chamber, a cabinet, and a cloakroom. Originally, the building had a cupola, which was destroyed in a fire in 1704.

After the death of Prince John Maurice in 1679, the house was owned by the Maes family, who leased the house to the Dutch government. In 1704, most of the interior of the Mauritshuis was destroyed by fire. The building was restored between 1708 and 1718.

In 1774, an art gallery open to the public was formed in what is now the Prince William V Gallery. That collection was seized by the French in 1795 and only partially recovered in 1808. The small gallery space soon proved to be too small, however, and in 1820, the Mauritshuis was bought by the Dutch state for the purpose of housing the Royal Cabinet of Paintings. In 1822, the Mauritshuis was opened to the public and housed the Royal Cabinet of Paintings and the Royal Cabinet of Rarities. In 1875, the entire museum became available for paintings.

The Mauritshuis was privatised in 1995. The foundation set up at that time took charge of both the building and the collection, which it was given on long-term loan. This building, which is the property of the state, is rented by the museum. In 2007, the museum announced its desire to expand. In 2010, the definitive design was presented. The museum would occupy a part of the nearby Sociëteit de Witte building. The two buildings would be connected via a tunnel, running underneath the Korte Vijverberg. The renovation started in 2012 and finished in 2014. During the renovation, about 100 of the museum's paintings were displayed in the Gemeentemuseum in the Highlights Mauritshuis exhibition. About 50 other paintings, including the Girl With the Pearl Earring, were on loan to exhibitions in the United States and Japan. The museum was reopened on 27 June 2014 by King Willem-Alexander.

Controversy over the colonial past of Prince Maurice

In 1664 Prince John Maurice ordered a marble bust portrait of himself for the garden of the Mauritshuis, the Prince's residence in the Hague. The statue was sculpted by the Flemish sculptor Bartholomeus Eggers. Prince Maurice had the bust moved to the burial chamber (Fürstengruft) in Siegen which he had built for himself in 1670.

In 1986 a copy of the statue made in plastic was placed inside the Mauritshuis. The bust was removed from the Mauritshuis in 2017 amidst controversy over Holland's colonial history and Prince John Maurice's role in the slave trade. The Mauritshuis museum has denied that the removal had anything to do with the controversy and has stated that the decision was taken on the grounds that the object was solely a copy made of plastic and the museum was unable to offer the necessary historical context for it in the foyer of the Mauritshuis where it was exhibited. The museum has since created a webpage dedicated to explaining the role of the Prince in the creation of the museum's building and collection and the museum's current view of the Prince. The statements on the page highlight the key role the Prince played in the slave trade in Brasil and how his immense wealth was likely sourced (in certain cases even in breach of then existing rules) from his involvement in the slave trade.

Collection

The collection of paintings of stadtholder William V, Prince of Orange was presented to the Dutch state by his son, King William I. This collection formed the basis of the Royal Cabinet of Paintings of around 200 paintings. The collection is currently called the Royal Picture Gallery. The current collection consists of almost 800 paintings and focusses on Dutch and Flemish artists, such as Pieter Brueghel, Paulus Potter, Peter Paul Rubens, Rembrandt van Rijn, Jacob van Ruisdael, Johannes Vermeer, and Rogier van der Weyden. There are also works of Hans Holbein in the collection in the Mauritshuis.

Selected exhibits

Administration 

The Mauritshuis was a state museum until 1995, when it became independent. The Prince William V Gallery is also managed by the organization.

The museum has a staff of around 50 people. Emilie Elise Saskia Gordenker was museum director from 2008 through 2009. Martine Gosselink assumed the directorship in February 2020. Victor Moussault served as deputy director from 2007 through 2016, succeeded by Sander Uitdenbogaard in 2017.

In the period 2005–2011, the Mauritshuis saw between 205,000 and 262,000 visitors per year. In 2011, the museum was the 13th most visited museum in the Netherlands. In 2012, when the museum closed for renovation on 1 April, it received 45,981 visitors. The museum was closed all of 2013 and was reopened on 27 June 2014. It closed for three months in the spring of 2020 in response to the Covid epidemic.

Visitors

References

External links

Official website

 
1822 establishments in the Netherlands
Art museums and galleries in the Netherlands
Art museums established in 1822
Buildings of the Dutch Golden Age
Houses completed in 1641
Houses in the Netherlands
Museums in The Hague
National museums of the Netherlands
Neoclassical architecture in the Netherlands
Palaces in the Netherlands
Royal residences in the Netherlands
Baroque palaces in the Netherlands
19th-century architecture in the Netherlands